Mutaib Al-Saqqar (22 January 1959 – 24 April 2021) was Jordanian singer. He was famous for performing traditional and patriotic songs.

Biography and career 
His launch was in the late 1990s, when he became famous after his song “Hala Ya Wasit Albait” written by the poet Habib Al-Zeyoudi at the beginning of His Majesty King Abdullah II receiving his constitutional powers.

He performed many national sports and heritage songs based on the well-known art of "Al-Joufiyah" in the region of Hauran. He also participated in many national operas and festivals such as the Jarash, Al Fuheis Festival, Amman and others. He also performed a number of concerts for Jordanian communities in the Arab countries in the Persian Gulf region and presented songs for the Jordanian national football team, he released many albums and presented a number of joint songs with Amal Shibli, Nahawand and Diana Karazon.

His most famous song was "Kindra of Millions," which he performed to celebrate the Iraqi journalist, Montazer Al-Zaidi, who threw shoes at former US President George W. Bush in 2008.

Songs 

 "Hala Ya Wasit Albait"
 "Imrana oh my country"
 "Dear God"
 "It shined and shuddered"
 "Muhannad and Lamis"
 "The shellah"
 "We are all forbid" (on behalf of the Jordanian pilot Muath al-Kasasbeh)
 "Mother of the martyr"
 "Sheikh of the Knights"
 "Noina for Farah"
 "Ezz headband"
 "Where are you sweet"
 "Ya Huma Lally"

Death 
He died in Amman on 24 April 2021, after suffering with the disease for a long time. He was admitted to the "King Abdullah University Hospital" in Ramtha District, and he underwent operations, where one of his feet was amputated due to the repercussions of diabetes, and a video clip was published in February of him on a hospital bed, and he said in press statements that he had suffered greatly due to the COVID-19 pandemic in Jordan crisis that affected his livelihood, which is parties, and as a result of the message, Crown Prince Hussein bore the cost of treatment at the expense of the royal court. He was suffering from kidney failure and was undergoing hemodialysis operations, and his corpse was most commonly found in the Jazura cemetery in Ar-Ramtha.

An official text was circulated to investigate the cause of his death, which had been opened, and it specifically stated that the cause of death was suicide after he dropped himself from the second floor in Al-Hussein Medical City in Amman. That the cause of his death was his fall from the second floor window of the hospital, a moment of loss of balance due to the treatments he was taking and being near the bed by the window.

References 

1959 births
2021 deaths
Jordanian male singers
People from Irbid Governorate